Victor William Henningsen, Jr. (May 19, 1924 – March 26, 2007) was an American businessman, entrepreneur, political activist and philanthropist.

Education and military service
Henningsen was educated at Phillips Academy, the U.S. Merchant Marine Academy and Yale University, where he graduated in 1950 and was a member of Skull and Bones. He served in the Atlantic, Mediterranean and Indian Ocean war zones as a midshipman, third and second mate in the merchant navy, finishing as Lt. (JG) in the United States Navy Reserve.

Business career
He spent his entire professional career with his family's poultry and egg company, Henningsen Foods Inc. (founded 1889), from office boy to President/CEO. He retired in 1993 as Chairman Emeritus.

Affiliations
He volunteered his services to his almae matres, the US Merchant Marine Academy (USMMA), as well as Sweet Briar College, where he was past president of the Board of Trustees. He was also a trustee of the Chapel of St. Thomas More at Yale. He was a past president of the Yale Club of New York City and of the American Friends of the Bermuda Maritime Museum.

Political career
Henningsen served as chair of the Pelham Community Chest in his hometown of Pelham Manor, New York, as trustee/mayor of the village of Pelham Manor, co-chairman of the Pelham Town Library, and board member (1985-2007) and chairman of the Board of Governors of the Sound Shore Medical Center from 1991-94.

Death
Henningsen died in 2007, aged 82, in Pelham Manor. He was survived by his widow, Mayde (née Ludington), whom he married in 1949,  and their four children and eight grandchildren.

External links
 New York Times obituary, March 28, 2007

1924 births
2007 deaths
American food industry business executives
Philanthropists from New York (state)
People from Pelham Manor, New York
Yale University alumni
Place of birth missing
20th-century American philanthropists